Region 8 or Region VIII can refer to:

 One of DVD region
 Former Region 8 (Johannesburg), an administrative district in the city of Johannesburg, South Africa, from 2000 to 2006
Biobío Region, Chile
Eastern Visayas Region, Philippines
 KAIT, a television station located in Jonesboro, Arkansas branded as Region 8

Region name disambiguation pages